Spasi me samoće is the third studio album by Serbian singer Dragana Mirković and the first to feature the band Južni Vetar. It was released in 1986.

This is Dragana's first album with Južni Vetar. They went on to record a total of five albums together, one was released each year beginning in 1986.

Track listing

References

1986 albums
Dragana Mirković albums